Francesco Picarelli (3 March 1631 – December 1708) was a Roman Catholic prelate who served as Bishop of Narni (1690–1708).

Biography
Francesco Picarelli was born in Sarnano, Italy on 3 March 1631.
He was ordained a deacon on 10 March 1674 and ordained a priest on 24 March 1674.
On 22 May 1690, he was appointed during the papacy of Pope Alexander VIII as Bishop of Narni.
On 4 June 1690, he was consecrated bishop by Fabrizio Spada, Cardinal-Priest of San Crisogono with Francesco Martelli, Titular Archbishop of Corinthus, with Victor Augustinus Ripa, Bishop of Vercelli, serving as co-consecrators. 
He served as Bishop of Narni until his death in December 1708.

References

External links and additional sources
 (Chronology of Bishops) 
 (Chronology of Bishops) 

17th-century Italian Roman Catholic bishops
18th-century Italian Roman Catholic bishops
Bishops appointed by Pope Alexander VIII
1631 births
1708 deaths